Valley of Fire is a 1951 American Western film directed by John English and written by Gerald Geraghty. The film stars Gene Autry, Gail Davis, Russell Hayden, Christine Larson, Harry Lauter and Terry Frost. The film was released on November 20, 1951, by Columbia Pictures.

Plot

Cast
Gene Autry as Gene Autry
Gail Davis as Laurie
Russell Hayden as Steve Guilford
Christine Larson as Bee Laverne
Harry Lauter as Tod Rawlings
Terry Frost as Grady McKean
Barbara Stanley as Gail
Teddy Infuhr as Virgil
Margie Liszt as Widow Blanche
Pat Buttram as Breezie Larrabee
Champion as Champ

References

External links
 

1951 films
American Western (genre) films
1951 Western (genre) films
Columbia Pictures films
Films directed by John English
American black-and-white films
1950s English-language films
1950s American films